Klemens Wilhelm Jacob Meckel (28 March 1842 – 5 July 1905) was a general in the Prussian army and foreign advisor to the government of Meiji period Japan.

Biography
Meckel was born in Cologne, Rhine Province, Prussia and joined the Prussian Army in 1860 as part of the 68th Infantry Regiment. He served in the Austro-Prussian War, fighting at Königgrätz, and was a veteran of the Franco-Prussian War. During the latter he was decorated with the Iron Cross.

In Japan
After the government of Meiji period Japan decided to model the Imperial Japanese Army after the Prussian army, following the German victory over the French in the Franco-Prussian War, Meckel (with the rank of major at the time) was invited to Japan as a professor at the Army Staff College and as an advisor to the Imperial Japanese Army General Staff. In response to a Japanese request, Prussian Chief of Staff Helmuth von Moltke selected Meckel.  He worked closely with future Prime Ministers General Katsura Tarō and General Yamagata Aritomo, and with army strategist General Kawakami Soroku. Meckel made numerous recommendations which were implemented, including reorganization of the command structure of the army into divisions and regiments, thus increasing mobility, strengthening the army logistics and transportation structure, with the major army bases connected by railways, establishing artillery and engineering regiments as independent commands, and revising the universal conscription system to abolish virtually all exceptions. A bust of Meckel was sited in front of the Japanese Army Staff College from 1909 through 1945.

Although his period in Japan (1885–1888) was relatively short, Meckel had a tremendous impact on the development of the Japanese military. He is credited with having introduced Clausewitz's military theories and the Prussian concept of war games (Kriegspiel) in a process of refining tactics. By training some sixty of the highest-ranking Japanese officers of the time in tactics, strategy and organization, he was able to replace the previous influences of the French advisors with his own philosophies. Meckel especially reinforced Hermann Roesler's ideal of subservience to the Emperor by teaching his pupils that Prussian military success was a consequence of the officer class's unswerving loyalty to their sovereign Emperor, however unswerving loyalty to superiors, in particular unswerving loyalty to the Emperor, was already an ideal in Japan, with the unswerving loyalty to the Emperor being expressly codified in Articles XI–XIII of the Meiji Constitution.

Meckel's reforms are credited with Japan's overwhelming victory over China in the First Sino-Japanese War of 1894–1895.

However, Meckel's tactical over-reliance on the use of infantry in offensive campaigns was later considered to have contributed to the large number of Japanese casualties in the subsequent Russo-Japanese War of 1904–1905.

On the German General Staff
On his return to Germany, Meckel first served in the 57th Infantry Regiment before becoming commander of the 88th Infantry Regiment in the Fortress of Mainz. He subsequently was promoted to major general in 1894, by this time being heading the military history department of the German General Staff. He also edited the 2nd and 3rd editions of Paul Bronsart von Schellendorff's Duties of the General Staff ('Der Dienst des Generalstabes). He became a senior department head (Oberquartiermeister) in 1895. However he was disliked by German Emperor Wilhelm II, who opposed his elevation into the ranks of Prussian peerage. He eventually was reassigned to command the 8th Infantry Brigade, but retired from active service shortly thereafter. He settled in Lichterfelde, near Berlin, and died there on July 5, 1906.

Notes

References
 Bassford, Christopher. (1994).  Clausewitz in English: The Reception of Clausewitz in Britain and America, 1815-1945. New York: Oxford University Press. 

 Martin, Bernd. (1995).  Japan and Germany in the modern world. Providence/Oxford: Berghahn Books. 
 Schellendorff, Paul Leopold Eduard Heinrich Anton Bronsart. (1893).  Duties of the General Staff translated by William Aldworth Home Hare. London: Her Majesty's Stationery Office.
 Schramm, Helmar, Ludger Schwarte and Jan Lazardzig. (2005).  Collection, Laboratory, Theater: Scenes of Knowledge in the 17th Century. Berlin: Walter de Gruyter. 
 Welch, Claude Emerson. (1976).  Civilian Control of the Military: Theory and Cases from Developing Countries. Albany: State University of New York Press. 
 Yiu, Angela. (1998).  Chaos and order in the works of Natsume Sōseki. Honolulu: University of Hawaii Press. 

1842 births
1906 deaths
Foreign advisors to the government in Meiji-period Japan
Recipients of the Order of the Rising Sun, 2nd class
Foreign educators in Japan
German expatriates in Japan
German military personnel of the Franco-Prussian War
Military personnel from Cologne
People from the Rhine Province
Major generals of Prussia
Recipients of the Iron Cross (1870), 2nd class
Prussian people of the Austro-Prussian War
German male non-fiction writers